Natalie Korneitsik is an Estonian beauty queen, presenter and model who won the title of Miss Tallinn 2012 and represented her country at Miss Universe 2012. She is the first Estonian ever on the Mexican television.

Early life
Born in Tallinn, Korneitsik was scouted by Elite Model Look in Estonia at the age of 16. Natalie worked as a model worldwide. After high school, she moved to Milan to continue her studies in Istituto Europeo di Design. Korneitsik speaks the Estonian, English, Russian, Italian and Spanish languages. She plays the piano and supports A.C. Milan. Natalie is of Estonian, Belarusian and American descent. Natalie Korneitsik appeared in the remake of Coolio´s historical single Gangsta's Paradise.

Eesti Miss Estonia 2012
Natalie Korneitsik is the First Princess who is 19 years old and 176 cm tall. She is a student and a model. While Margret Joseph is the Second Princess who is 19 years old and 170 cm tall.

Miss Universe 2012
Natalie Korneitsik represented her country at Miss Universe 2012 that was held in Las Vegas on December 19. Natalie did not make it into top 15, though was named by press sources and bloggers as the best representative from her country in many years.

After competition
After Miss Universe 2012, Natalie Korneitsik traveled to Asia to promote her title and country. In Indonesia, she guest-starred on several TV shows such as Pas Mantab and Hitam Putih :id:Hitam Putih (Acara TV). On the show Natalie claimed her main purpose was a cultural exchange between Estonia and Asia as well as to increase an awareness of her country. Natalie Korneitsik has been a part of Estonian delegation at Miss Universe 2013 in Moscow.

Currently lives in Mexico City.

In December 2016 Natalie Korneitsik entered CEA of Televisa, becoming the first Estonian ever who made it to Mexican television.
Natalie Korneitsik was one of the ambassadors of the FIFA World Cup 2018 in Mexico and covered the event later on in Russia

References

External links
Natalie Korneitsik: Road to Miss Universe (in Estonian)
Natalie Korneitsik: I need support of Estonia (in Russian)
Official Miss Globe International website

Living people
Miss Universe 2012 contestants
People from Tallinn
Estonian beauty pageant winners
Estonian female models
Estonian people of Belarusian descent
Estonian people of American descent
Year of birth missing (living people)